Koombooloomba National Park is a protected area mostly within the Tablelands Region, Queensland, Australia. The park is within the Wet Tropics World Heritage Area and is known for its endangered wet schlerophyll forests and for unique animals and plants.

References 

National parks of Queensland
Tablelands Region
Wet Tropics of Queensland